National Route 18 (officially, PY18) is a highway in Paraguay, which runs from northern Itapúa to Central, crossing also the departments of Caazapá, Guairá and Paraguarí.

History
With the Resolution N° 1090/19, it obtained its current number and elevated to National Route in 2019 by the MOPC (Ministry of Public Works and Communications).

Distances, cities and towns

The following table shows the distances traversed by PY18 in each different department, showing cities and towns that it passes by (or near).

References

18